Leneuoti Matusi is a Tuvaluan politician and former civil servant who was elected as an Independent MP for the Nui constituency in a 2013 by-election, having previously served as the Secretary of the Nui Falekaupule.

Matusi gained 297 votes out of 778 to gain the seat from the former sitting member Taom Tanukale who polled just 160 votes after resigning from Parliament on 30 July 2013 following the constitutional crisis. He will represent Nui alongside Pelenike Tekinene Isaia, who is the island's only female MP.

A week after the by-election, Prime Minister Enele Sopoaga announced that Matusi had joined the government's side, helping to boost their members to nine.

Matusi was not re-elected to parliament in the 2015 Tuvaluan general election.

References

2013 in Tuvalu
Members of the Parliament of Tuvalu